Mattanawcook Academy is a public high school located in Lincoln, Maine, United States, that was founded in 1847 as Lincoln High School.  The name was changed to Mattanawcook Academy in 1850.  On July 1, 1968, the towns of Chester, Burlington, Lowell, Lincoln, Mattawamkeag, and Macwahoc joined for mutual benefit and formed Regional School Unit No. 67 which now comprises Mattanawcook Academy, Mattanawcook Junior High School, and Ella P. Burr Elementary School.

School mascot
The Mattanawcook Academy mascot is the lynx.

School colors
The school colors are maroon and gray.

References

External links 
Mattanawcook Academy Official Website
History of Lincoln, Maine

Public high schools in Maine
Schools in Penobscot County, Maine
Lincoln, Maine